Athis pinchoni is a moth in the Castniidae family. It is found in Martinique in the Lesser Antilles.

References

Moths described in 2003
Castniidae